Sleep Talking may refer to:
Sleep talking or somniloquy
Sleep Talking (EP), a 2013 EP by Nu'est
"Sleep Talking", a song by Level 42 from the 2006 album Retroglide
"Sleep Talking", a jazz composition by Ornette Coleman from the album Sound Grammar
"Sleep Talking", a song by American pop singer Charlotte Lawrence

See also
Talking in Your Sleep (disambiguation)